Sven-Harry's Art Museum is an art museum in Stockholm, Sweden, founded by builder Sven-Harry Karlsson. It is housed in a multi-purpose building alongside an art gallery, museum shop, apartments, and businesses.

History 
The award-winning Swedish builder  (b. 1931) has been an art collector since the mid-1960s, forming a collection including work by Carl Fredrik Hill, Helene Schjerfbeck, Ernst Josephson, August Strindberg, Edvard Munch, Anders Zorn, and others. He constructed a building to house his collection in Vasaparken in Stockholm's inner city.  Designed by Gert Wingårdh and Anna Höglund of Wingårdh Architects, the 5-story building is clad in a gold-tinted copper-aluminium-zinc alloy designed not to darken when exposed to oxygen.  It opened in 2011 and is now owned and run by a foundation. Its director since 2018 has been Dragana Kusoffsky Maksimović. 

In addition to Sven-Harry's Art Museum, the building houses an art gallery, a museum shop, a restaurant and other businesses, and 18 apartments in its . The museum is located at the top of the building and its interior spaces are designed as a replica of Sven-Harry Karlsson's former home in Lidingö, which dated back to the 1770s. It exhibits work by artists such as Karin Mamma Andersson and Torsten Andersson. The remainder of the ground floor is taken up by commercial enterprises.

References

2011 establishments in Sweden
Art museums established in 2011
Art museums and galleries in Stockholm